Blastobasis industria is a moth in the family Blastobasidae. It is found in Ethiopia and South Africa.

The length of the forewings is 7.9–9.9 mm. The forewings are pale brown intermixed with brown scales tipped with white and brown scales. The hindwings are pale brown.

The larvae have been reported feeding on the beans of Coffea arabica, but this is probably based on a misidentification.

References

Moths described in 1913
Blastobasis
Moths of Africa
Insects of Ethiopia